The Potter Box is a model for making ethical decisions, developed by Ralph B. Potter, Jr., professor of social ethics emeritus at Harvard Divinity School. It is commonly used by communication ethics scholars. According to this model, moral thinking should be a systematic process and how we come to decisions must be based in some reasoning.

Steps
The Potter Box is an ethical framework used to make decisions by utilizing four categories which Potter identifies as universal to all ethical dilemmas. Potter was a theologian when he developed this moral reasoning framework. The Potter Box uses four dimensions of moral analysis to help in situations where ethical dilemmas occur: Facts, Values, Principles, and Loyalties as described below. 
The Potter Box consists of a few simple steps, which can be completed in any order. You may also move between the steps several times before an adequate decision is made. The steps are numbered for simplicity's sake, and it may help you to organize the steps into quadrants (Cliff Christens came up with this idea).

Definition / Facts
The definition stage of the Potter Box concerns the facts of the issue at hand. Here is where the analyst should set out all facts without making judgments or hiding any facts. 
Example: Using a photograph of a car wreck to promote safe driving, making it visible to the target viewers.

Values
At this stage the analyst should state and compare the merits of different values to acknowledge the influences on decision-making.  By referring to the specific concerns of the individuals involved, it allows the analyst to identify differences in perspectives.
We may judge something according to aesthetic values (harmonious, pleasing), professional values (innovative, prompt), logical values (consistent, competent), sociocultural values (thrift, hard work), and moral values (honesty, nonviolence).

Example (continued)- Will the shock value of the images encourage safe driving habits? Will the images stir up potentially disturbing memories for certain people?

Principles
Principles are ethical philosophies or modes of ethical reasoning that may be applicable to the situation. By considering the values stated above from several ethical philosophies, the decision-maker is better equipped to understand the situation. The following are some of the ethical philosophies that may be utilized under this segment of Potter's Box:

 Aristotle's Golden Mean. Aristotle's Golden Mean defines moral virtue as a middle state determined by practical wisdom that emphasizes moderation and temperance.
 Confucius' Golden Mean. Confucius' Golden Mean is more commonly known as the compromise principle and says moral virtue is the appropriate location between two extremes.
 Kant's Categorical Imperative. Kant's Categorical Imperative dictates that you must do unto others what you would want them to do unto you, or to act as if your personal decisions and actions could become universal law.
 Mill's Principle of Utility. John Stuart Mill's Principle of Utility dictates that we must seek the greatest happiness for the greatest number of people.
 Rawls' Veil of Ignorance. John Rawls' Veil of Ignorance asks us to assume we don't know which stakeholder position we would find ourselves in, removing our personal interests from the analysis.
 Agape Principle. This principle, also known as the 'Persons as Ends' principle, emphasizes love for our fellow humans and the golden rule. He stresses that when we love our neighbors, we shall seek to do good to them, therefore, we should love fellow humans the same way we love ourselves.

These help link concrete options to overarching principles, getting us to think about our own basic values.

Loyalties
Loyalties concern who the decision-maker has allegiances or loyalties to. For example, in journalism, the first allegiance is always to the public. Other allegiances a journalist might have would be to his or her employer, industry organizations or co-workers. Are we more concerned about being true to our own values or about the effectiveness of the campaign? Is the "greater good" more important than the "golden mean"?

Understanding Values
To understand the Potter Box method, you must first understand types of Values categorized that influence Ethical behavior:

Professional.
Proximity, Firstness, Impact/ magnitude, Recency, Conflict, Human Interest, Entertainment, Novelty, Toughness, Thoroughness, Immediacy, Independence, No prior restraint, Public’s right to know

Moral Values.
Truth-telling, Humanness, Justice/fairness, Freedom, Independence, Stewardship, Honesty, Nonviolence, Commitment, Self-control

Aesthetic.
Harmonious, Pleasing, Imaginative

Logical.
Consistent, Competent, Knowledgeable

Socio-cultural.
Thrift, Hard work, Energy, Restraint

Using the Potter Box
The Potter Box focuses on moral issues as opposed to pragmatic or legal ones, such as how to avoid getting sued or fired. With regard to ethics, however, it can be used to reflect on any situation that requires moral decision-making. Its four steps, at least initially, should be followed in order.

The Potter Box does not offer a single, clear-cut solution to ethical dilemmas. Indeed, two different people analyzing the same issue with the Potter Box could arrive at two very different conclusions. Moreover, the same person analyzing the same issue could come to different decisions when using the Box at two different times. Nevertheless, the Potter Box can help you think through what to do. It offers a process to help you weigh your options in a methodical manner.

In addition, the name "Potter Box" may indicate that this process is very rigid, but in fact it is fluid, and you may have to go back and forth among the steps before you can reach a conclusion that satisfies you. This process also becomes easier and quicker with practice. Over time, it can become second nature.

References

Straubhaar, LaRose, Davenport. (2014) Media Now: Understanding Media, Culture, and Technology, 8th ed., pp. 479–500.

Social ethics
Social philosophy